The State Secretary for Foreign Affairs is the highest position below the rank of cabinet minister at the Swedish Ministry for Foreign Affairs. , Jan Knutsson is State Secretary.

The title can alternatively be translated as Undersecretary of State for Foreign Affairs or Secretary General of the Ministry for Foreign Affairs. 

For historical reasons, this position has a different title in Swedish than the other State Secretaries of the Swedish government; the other posts are termed statssekreterare.

Before 1945, in a situation where the political head of the ministry often changed rapidly, the Secretary General represented the continuous lines in Sweden's foreign policy; and was considered a prestigious step in the diplomatic career.

From 1932, Sweden has experienced a great deal of stability on the post of Foreign Minister, and from 1945 and on the post as Cabinet Secretary has increasingly been politized and a subject of replacement in connection with shifts of Foreign Minister. The precise role of the Cabinet Secretary has changed from cabinet to cabinet, particularly due to different prime ministers' particular interest and involvement in the shaping of foreign policy.

List
1791–1792: Aron Isak Silfversparre
1792–1801: Schering Rosenhane
1801–1805: Gustaf Lagerbielke
1805–1809: Gustaf af Wetterstedt
1809–1811: Carl Aron Ehrengranat
1811–1814: Aron Hjort
1814–1817: Erik Julius Lagerheim
1817–1825: David von Schulzenheim
1825–1831: Elias Lagerheim
1831–1840: Albrecht Elof Ihre
1840–1855: Ludvig Manderström
1855–1859: Albert Ehrensvärd
1859–1864: Carl Fredrik Palmstierna
1864–1866: Carl Johan Albert Sandströmer
1866–1869: Frans Theodor Lindstrand
1869–1870: Lave Gustaf Beck-Friis
1870–1873: Hans Henrik von Essen
1873–1876: Carl Lewenhaupt
1876–1886: Alfred Lagerheim
1886–1889: Carl Bildt
1889–1895: August Gyldenstolpe
1895–1900: Arvid Taube
1900–1903: Thor von Ditten
1903–1905: Eric Trolle
1905–1906: Carl Haraldsson Strömfelt
1906–1908: Albert Ehrensvärd
1908–1913: Fredrik Ramel
1913–1918: Oskar Ewerlöf
1918–1922: Wollmar Boström
1922–1928: Erik Sjöborg
1928–1931: Einar Hennings
1931–1934: Carl Hamilton
1934–1937: Christian Günther
1938–1944: Erik Boheman
1944–1945: Vacant
1945–1945: Stig Sahlin
1945–1947: Karl Ivan Westman
1947–1949: Hans Beck-Friis
1949–1951: Dag Hammarskjöld
1951–1956: Arne S. Lundberg
1956–1967: Leif Belfrage
1967–1972: Ole Jödahl
1972–1977: Sverker Åström
1977–1982: Leif Leifland
1982–1991: Pierre Schori
1991–1994: Lars-Åke Nilsson
1994–2000: Jan Eliasson
2000–2006: Hans Dahlgren
2006–2014: Frank Belfrage
2014–2019: Annika Söder
2019–2022: Robert Rydberg
2022–    : Jan Knutsson

References

External links
 

Government of Sweden